International Centre for Automotive Technology (iCAT) is located at Manesar in Gurugram district of Haryana state of India. The Rs 1100 crore facility has facilities for vehicle homologation and also testing laboratories for noise, vibration and harshness (NVH) and passive safety. It also includes a powertrain laboratory, engine dynamometers, emission laboratory with Euro-V capability, a fatigue laboratory, passive safety laboratory, and vehicle test tracks. iCAT is also being developed as a Centre of Excellence (CoE) for component development and NVH.

Tests and approvals of vehicles and their components are conducted under the Central Motor Vehicle Rules (CMVR) – Rule No. 126 for which iCAT is accredited for. iCAT also has permission by BIS (Bureau of Indian Standards) for tests on wheels, tires and glass for BIS certification. iCAT is also accredited by the Central Pollution Control Board (CPCB) for testing and approval of generators.

Facilities
The following facilities are being provided at ICAT:
Active & passive safety testing
Component evaluation testing
Fatigue testing 
Material testing
EMI / EMC laboratory
Noise Vibration Harshness
Powertrain
Vehicle Evaluation Facilities & Homologation Test Tracks
Vehicle evaluation
ICAT Convention Centre (ICC)
Engine Test Lab
Vehicle test cell
On road testing

See also
 Automotive Research & Testing Center
 NATRiP

References

Automotive testing agencies
Research institutes in Haryana
Automotive industry in India
Research institutes established in 2006
2006 establishments in Haryana